Hou Yu (born 30 December 1990) is a Chinese footballer who currently plays as a goalkeeper for Meizhou Hakka

Club career
Hou Yu would start his career with Guangdong Sunray Cave in the 2007 league season and was part of the squad that won promotion with the team at the end of the 2008 China League Two season. He was often used as a substitute goalkeeper and was loaned out to Hong Kong football club Sun Hei where he had a successful period with them going on to establish himself as their first choice goalkeeper as they went on to win the 2011–12 Hong Kong Senior Challenge Shield cup with the club. Within the match he would personally win the MVP award as Sun Hei won 5-3 on penalties against South China. On his return to Guangdong, Hou was unable to go on to establish himself at his parent club and he joined third tier side Meizhou Hakka along with his teammate and fellow goalkeeper Li Weijun.

At Meizhou, Hou was used as the substitute goalkeeper behind Li Weijun as the club went on to win the 2015 China League Two division and promotion into the second tier. Li Weijun would retire at the end of the 2016 season and Hou was promoted to the clubs first choice goalkeeper where he quickly established himself as an integral member of the team as well as eventually becoming their captain. He would then go on to lead the team that gained promotion to the top tier after coming second within the division at the end of the 2021 China League One campaign.

Career statistics

Honours

Club
Sun Hei
Hong Kong Senior Challenge Shield: 2011–12

Meizhou Hakka
China League Two: 2015

References

External links

1990 births
Living people
Chinese footballers
Chinese expatriate footballers
Association football goalkeepers
Hong Kong Premier League players
China League Two players
China League One players
Sun Hei SC players
Meizhou Hakka F.C. players
Chinese expatriate sportspeople in Hong Kong
Expatriate footballers in Hong Kong